S37 may refer to:

Aviation 
 Blériot-SPAD S.37, a French biplane airliner
 Sikorsky S-37, an American sesquiplane
 Smoketown Airport, in Lancaster County, Pennsylvania, United States
 Sukhoi S-37, an experimental Russian jet fighter

Other uses 
 County Route S37 (Bergen County, New Jersey)
 S37: Wear suitable gloves, a safety phrase
 SREC (file format), an ASCII encoding format for binary data
 Sulfur-37, an isotope of sulfur
 Taungurung language
 , a submarine of the United States Navy